is a Japanese financial services holding company headquartered in Chūō, Tokyo. It is mainly involved in providing brokerage services through its subsidiary Tokai Tokio Securities.

Tokai Tokyo Securities was formed from a merger between Tokai Maruman Securities and Tokyo Securities in 2009. Tokai Maruman itself was the product of a merger between Maruman and Tokai in 1996. Maruman, Tokai and Tokyo Securities were founded in 1908, 1944 and 1929 respectively. In 2009, the group restructured to create Tokai Tokio Financial Holdings as the listed holding company.

The group is present in Asia and the United States through strategic partnerships and alliances. In 2013, it formed business alliances with the Bank of East Asia in Hong Kong and Stifel in the United States.

References

External links

  
  

Financial services companies based in Tokyo
Holding companies based in Tokyo
Companies listed on the Tokyo Stock Exchange
Holding companies established in 2009
Financial services companies established in 2009
Japanese companies established in 2009